Bagdad is a copper mining community and census-designated place (CDP) in Yavapai County, Arizona, United States, in the western part of the state. It is one of only two remaining company towns in Arizona. The population was 1,876 at the 2010 census, up from 1,578 in 2000.

Name
According to legend, the name "Bagdad" is not a misspelling of "Baghdad". Supposedly a father and son operated a small-scale copper mining operation there in the late 1800s. The father dug out the ore and the son loaded it into bags. When one bag was full he asked his father "Do you have a bag, dad?" However, this is disputed and some say the name derives from the Iraqi capital, Baghdad, imagined as an epitome of wealth and luxury.

Demographics

Bagdad first appeared on the 1930 U.S. Census as the Bagdad Precinct of Yavapai County. It was recorded as having a Spanish/Hispanic majority for that census (the census would not separately feature that racial demographic again until 1980). With the combination of all county precincts into 3 districts in 1940, it did not formally appear again until 1960, when it reported as an unincorporated village. In 1980, it was made a census-designated place (CDP).

As of the census of 2010, there were 1,876 people, 682 households, and 485 families residing in the CDP. The racial makeup of the CDP was 86.6% White, 0.5% Black or African American, 3.0% Native American, 0.3% Asian, 0.1% Pacific Islander, 6.3% from other races, and 3.3% from two or more races. 24.4% of the population were Hispanic or Latino of any race.

There were 682 households, out of which 43.4% had children under the age of 18 living with them, 57.0% were married couples living together, 5.9% had a female householder with no husband present, and 28.9% were non-families. 24.6% of all households were made up of individuals, and 3.1% had someone living alone who was 65 years of age or older. The average household size was 2.75 and the average family size was 3.29.

In the CDP, the population was spread out, with 33.1% under the age of 18, 8.6% from 18 to 24, 29.6% from 25 to 44, 24.3% from 45 to 64, and 4.4% who were 65 years of age or older. The median age was 30 years. For every 100 females, there were 123.9 males. For every 100 females age 18 and over, there were 119.0 males.

The median income for a household in the CDP was $58,277, and the median income for a family was $61,850. Males had a median income of $50,000 versus $40,506 for females. The per capita income for the CDP was $24,370. About 1.3% of families and 2.8% of the population were below the poverty line, including 4.8% of those under age 18 and 9.5% of those age 65 or over.

Geography and climate

According to the Köppen climate classification system, Bagdad has a typical Arizona semi-arid climate, located on the boundary between BSh and BSk on climate maps.

Copper mine

In 1882, prospectors W.J. Pace and J.M. Murphy staked a claim for gold, silver, and lead along Copper Creek. In 1883, John Lawler of Prescott, Arizona paid Pace and Murphy $200 for their claims, but were unable to make a success of it. In 1907, the Giroux Syndicate purchased an option on Lawler's claims for $200,000, with Edmond Bronson as president. However, the mine was still not able to earn a profit, and operations languished off and on for years. In 1944, the operation was purchased by John C. Lincoln, the builder of the Camelback Inn, who converted the mine entirely from underground operation to open-pit. In 1979, the operation was purchased by AMOCO Minerals, eventually owned by Cyprus Mines.

Cyprus Mines Corporation operated the copper mine until Cyprus merged with Phelps Dodge.Freeport-McMoRan (which acquired Phelps Dodge in 2007) now operates the copper/molybdenum mine. This copper mine does open pit mining and runs on an around-the-clock schedule. The copper concentrate is either trucked to southern Arizona, or taken by semi to 20 miles outside of town to the BNSF Railway's Phoenix Subdivision in Hillside.

Services

Freeport-McMoRan owns all of the housing and commercial buildings in Bagdad. The town has a main shopping center named Copper Plaza, with a small Bashas' grocery store and other businesses. Copper Plaza used to have a bank, but Stockmen's Bank pulled out due to lack of profits. However, the Arizona State Credit Union and the Bashas' Associates Federal Credit Union (BAFCU) both installed ATMs inside Bashas'.

The Bagdad Community Health Center operates a medical clinic. Fry's Food and Drug operates a pharmacy in this clinic as well.

Education
Bagdad Unified School District was formed on July 1, 1930.  The first graduating class from Bagdad High School was in 1945.

The Bagdad Unified School District #20 consists of a high school, elementary school, and a junior high school. The high school and junior high are merged into one. All of the teachers in the high school and junior high teach every grade level.  The Hillside Community School is not a member of this district. All schools of this district are now on one campus.

Bagdad High School consists of 7th through 12th grades.  Bagdad Elementary School consists of preschool through 6th grades.

The Yavapai County Free Library District operates the Bagdad Library.

Transportation
Arizona State Route 96 connects Bagdad with Arizona State Route 97 and Hillside, Arizona.

See also
 Upper Burro Creek Wilderness

References

Further reading
 Jarman, Max. "Copper is lifeblood for Bagdad". Arizona Republic, May 28, 2005.

External links
 Bagdad, Arizona – official site
 Community website
 Community profile

Census-designated places in Yavapai County, Arizona
Mining communities in Arizona
Company towns in Arizona